a.k.a. Yasui Shūchi is a Japanese director and screenwriter primarily known for his work in pink films but who has also worked in adult videos (AV) and in mainstream film.

Life and career
Kataoka was born in Hokkaido on November 23, 1950. He studied at the College of Economics at Kanto Gakuin University but dropped out before graduation. In the early 1980s he began to work at producer-director Kan Mukai's Shishi Productions. At first he worked as an assistant director for Mukai and Yōjirō Takita and then released his debut film as a director in 1983, Yokoku Bōkō: Yaru! Sasu!, the first of a series of action films starring Usagi Asō distributed by the Toei Company.

Since then he has made many action pink films, and has gone on to direct mainstream movies and V-Cinema. At the Pink Grand Prix for 1988 Kataoka's Subway Serial Rape: Lover Hunting was awarded Best Film, and Kataoka was given the awards for Best Director and Best Screenplay.

Partial filmography
  (1983)
 S&M Hunter (地獄のローパー、緊縛・SM・18才(SMクレーン、宙吊り), 1986)
 S&M Hunter - Legend of Yakuza　(SM倫子のおもらし, 1986)
 S&M Hunter Begins (逆さ吊し縛り縄, 1985)
 Subway Serial Rape Series (「地下鉄連続レイプ」シリーズ, 1985-1988)
 Subway Serial Rape: Lover Hunting (地下鉄連続レイプ　愛人狩り, 1988)

Bibliography

English

Japanese

References

External links
  (Essay by Kataoka)

 
|-
! colspan="3" style="background: #DAA520;" | Pink Grand Prix
|-

1950 births
Japanese film directors
Pink film directors
Japanese screenwriters
Living people
People from Asahikawa
Kanto Gakuin University alumni